Ichthyosis linearis circumflexa is a distinctive skin condition of generalized hyperkeratosis and polycyclic and serpiginous erythematous plaques with a characteristic, migratory, double-edged scale at the margins, and is the typical cutaneous manifestation of Netherton's syndrome.

See also 
 Ichthyosis prematurity syndrome
 List of cutaneous conditions

References 

Genodermatoses